Picasso is a two Michelin star restaurant run by chef Julian Serrano in Las Vegas, Nevada, United States. The name is derived from the artist Pablo Picasso and features the artist's paintings throughout the restaurant. The cuisine of Picasso is French with a Spanish influence, and the restaurant is known for its reinvention and interpretation of these cuisines. Today, the restaurant holds two Michelin stars, the Forbes Five-Star Award, the AAA Five-Diamond Award, a 28/30 rating from the Zagat guide, the Wine Spectator Grand Award since 2001, and is considered to be one of the finest restaurants in the United States.

Awards and accolades
 1998-2017: AAA Five-Diamond Award
 2002: Best Chef: Southwest, Winner, James Beard Foundation Award
 2008, 2009: Michelin Two Stars
 2013: Outstanding Wine Service, Finalist, James Beard Foundation Award

In popular culture
 Julian Serrano also owns a molecular gastronomy Spanish eponymous restaurant named "Julian Serrano." This restaurant is also located in Las Vegas.
Picasso was a filming location for the 2001 film Ocean's Eleven.

See also
 List of restaurants in the Las Vegas Valley

Notes

References

External links
 Official website
 Executive Chef Julian Serrano Official Website

Michelin Guide starred restaurants in Nevada
Molecular gastronomy
Restaurants established in 1998
Restaurants in the Las Vegas Valley
1998 establishments in Nevada